Hard Target 2 is a 2016 American vigilante action film directed and shot by Roel Reiné. It is a direct-to-video sequel of the 1993 action film Hard Target starring Jean-Claude Van Damme, although it has no connection to the first movie and is only sequel by name. The film stars Scott Adkins, Robert Knepper, Ann Truong, Rhona Mitra, and Temuera Morrison. It continues the human hunt theme in the jungles of Myanmar and Thailand.

Plot
Professional MMA fighter Wes Baylor takes on Jonny Sutherland in a match at the MGM Grand. Upset with the judges' score, Baylor tries to knock Sutherland out and accidentally kills him. Overwhelmed with guilt, Baylor enters self-imposed exile in Thailand.

Six months later, Baylor is still haunted by the death of Sutherland and competes in underground fight clubs. A man, Aldrich, watches Baylor fight, and impressed with him, offers him $1 million for a private one-off match in Myanmar. Upon arrival, Baylor is informed that he will be the victim of a lethal hunt organized by Aldrich. Baylor is given a water bottle and money belt which, unbeknown to him, has a GPS tracker hidden inside. The hunting party consists of Sofia, bullfighter Esparto, video game designer Landon, Maduka, Jacob "Texas" Zimling, Zimling's son Tobias, Aldrich's right-hand man Madden, and Aldrich himself. In addition, the party is accompanied by a group of corrupt Myanmar Army soldiers.

Maduka shoots Baylor with a sniper rifle at a waterfall, but Baylor goes underwater, sneaks up on Maduka, and beats him to death. While fleeing from them, Baylor comes across a local woman named Tha, who helps him get to the border. As the hunt continues, Aldrich gives the hunters motorcycles equipped with guns and rocket launchers. Baylor fights them and commandeers a motorcycle, leaving Tha alone. Zimling and Tobias attempt to kill Tha, but Tobias has a brief change of heart and flees. Tha then kills Zimling with a machete, while Baylor fights Sofia. After knocking her unconscious, he regroups with Tha and they run away. The two go to Tha's house to treat wounds, where Baylor learns something strange about Tha and her village.

After running towards the border, Tha and Baylor come across a field full of landmines. Aldrich and the party arrive at the edge of the minefield, having tracked Baylor via the GPS. Tobias, angered by the death of his father, chases Baylor with an M-16 and is killed by a crossbow bolt that Baylor fires. He drops the assault rifle as he dies and triggers an explosion of the mines. The explosion gives Baylor and Tha enough time to hide in a cave, where Tha finds her missing brother, who is revealed as a previous target of Aldrich's group. He had managed to evade the hunting group's detection and hide.

In the morning, Tha and her brother run away, leaving Baylor behind. Tha and her brother are captured, and Baylor rescues them by capturing Landon. Tha then shoves a sharp object through Sofia's neck which kills her. Meanwhile, Landon's neck is slashed by Aldrich for secretly recording all of the events, which was forbidden. Baylor, Tha, and her brother all reach the border and wonder how Aldrich continuously knows where they are. They find the tracker in the money belt. Baylor takes on the soldiers working for Aldrich and remaining hunters alone while Tha and her brother hide. Esparto goes after Tha and her brother but is killed with a fishing harpoon. Meanwhile, Baylor runs away with the boat from the army camp and heads towards the border.

Pursued by the army, Baylor manages to reach the border bridge, where he faces Aldrich and Madden in a final showdown. Aldrich accidentally shoots Madden after Baylor uses him as a human shield who tries to shoot him and Baylor severely beats Aldrich, who orders the Myanmar army to fire on him. Tha suddenly arrives and bribes the general into ceasing fire to save Baylor. Aldrich is outraged and attempts to shoot Baylor himself, at which point the general orders his army to shoot him dead. Having survived the ordeal, Baylor returns to Thailand with Tha to teach children Taekwondo.

Cast

 Scott Adkins as Wes Baylor
 Robert Knepper as Aldrich
 Rhona Mitra as Sofia
 Temuera Morrison as Madden
 Ann Truong as Tha
 Adam Saunders as Esparto
 Jamie Timony as Landon
 Peter Hardy as Jacob Zimling
 Sean Keenan as Tobias Zimling
 Troy Honeysett as Jonny Sutherland
 Gigi Veliciat as Maduka
 Katrina Grey as Kay Sutherland

Reception

Critical response
Tyler Foster of DVD Talk rated it 1/5 stars and wrote, "As mindless entertainment, all Reine and screenwriters Matt Harvey and Dominic Morgan really need is some consistency, but none of them seem to care."

Joblo.com rated it 5/10 and described it as "A disappointment".

References

External links
 
 

2016 films
2016 direct-to-video films
2016 action films
2016 martial arts films
2010s vigilante films
American films about revenge
American action films
American martial arts films
American vigilante films
Direct-to-video action films
Direct-to-video sequel films
Films about death games
Films directed by Roel Reiné
Films set in 2014
Films set in 2015
Films set in the Las Vegas Valley
Films set in Myanmar
Films shot in Thailand
Universal Pictures direct-to-video films
2010s English-language films
2010s American films